Lieselotte Anni "Lilo" Allgayer Deutzer König (6 October 1915 – 23 December 2009) was a German fencer. She competed in the women's individual foil event at the 1952 Summer Olympics.

References

External links
 

1915 births
2009 deaths
German female fencers
Olympic fencers of West Germany
Fencers at the 1952 Summer Olympics
Sportspeople from Darmstadt (region)
People from Main-Kinzig-Kreis
20th-century German women